Allium trifoliatum, commonly called pink garlic and Hirsute garlic, is a Mediterranean species of wild onion. It is native to France, Cyprus, Malta, Italy (Sicily, Sardinia, Calabria, Basilicata, Apulia, Campania, Abruzzo), Greece, Egypt, Turkey, Lebanon,  Palestine, and Israel.

Allium trifoliatum is a perennial herb up to 30 cm tall. It has a tight umbel with short pedicels. Tepals are white, sometimes with pink to red midveins.

formerly included
 Allium trifoliatum race loiseleurii Rouy, now called Allium subhirsutum subsp. subhirsutum
 Allium trifoliatum subsp. obtusitepalum Svent, now called Allium subhirsutum subsp. obtusitepalum (Svent.) G.Kunkel

References

External links

Wild Plants of Malta, Allium trifoliatum
Trek Nature, photos of Allium trifoliatum in Cyprus

trifoliatum
Onions
Plants described in 1792
Flora of Israel
Flora of Palestine (region)
Flora of Malta